Alma Lepina-Lāce (born 8 June 1974) is a Latvian former competitive figure skater. She represented Latvia at the 1992 Winter Olympics in Albertville and finished 20th. Her best result at an ISU Championship was 13th at the 1993 Europeans in Helsinki, Finland. Lepina was coached by Oļegs Nagumanovs and Marika Nagumanova and represented the Daugava club.

Competitive highlights

References

External links
 
 
 

1974 births
Latvian female single skaters
Living people
Sportspeople from Riga
Olympic figure skaters of Latvia
Figure skaters at the 1992 Winter Olympics